Glenea suturata is a species of beetle in the family Cerambycidae. It was described by Gressitt in 1939. It is known from China.

References

suturata
Beetles described in 1939